Eye in the Pyramid may refer to:

The Eye in the Pyramid, a book in The Illuminatus! Trilogy by Robert Shea and Robert Anton Wilson
Eye of Providence, an ancient symbol